James Joyce Bridge is a road bridge spanning the River Liffey in Dublin, Ireland, joining the south quays to Blackhall Place on the north side.

Designed by Spanish architect Santiago Calatrava, it is a single-span structural steel design, 40 m (131 ft) long. The deck is supported from two outward angled arches, the silhouette of which is sometimes compared to the shape of an open book.

The bridge was built by Irishenco Construction, using pre-fabricated steel sections from Harland and Wolff of Belfast.

The bridge is named for the famous Dublin author James Joyce (1882–1941), and was opened on 16 June 2003 (Bloomsday). Joyce's short story "The Dead" is set in Number 15 Usher's Island, the house facing the bridge on the south side.

See also
 Samuel Beckett Bridge

References

External links
 

Bridges in Dublin (city)
Bridges completed in 2003
Bridges by Santiago Calatrava
James Joyce
21st-century architecture in the Republic of Ireland